Ashan Ranaweera (born 1 December 1973) is a Sri Lankan former cricketer. He played in 58 first-class and 29 List A matches between 1996/97 and 2009/10. He made his Twenty20 debut on 17 August 2004, for Moors Sports Club in the 2004 SLC Twenty20 Tournament.

References

External links
 

1973 births
Living people
Sri Lankan cricketers
Burgher Recreation Club cricketers
Moors Sports Club cricketers
Moratuwa Sports Club cricketers